Mark-Jan Fledderus (born 14 December 1982) is a Dutch former professional footballer and current football executive, who works as technical director of FC Groningen. During his playing career, he mainly appeared as a midfielder.

Club career
A free-kick specialist, the left-sided midfielder made his professional debut for SC Heerenveen and played for Stormvogels Telstar and FC Groningen before joining Roda JC Kerkrade on a free in 2011. He returned to his former team Heracles in 2014.

Fledderus retired from playing football in summer 2017 and joined Heracles' board of directors as an assistant to general manager Nico Jan Hoogma.

References

External links
 Voetbal International profile 

1982 births
Living people
People from Coevorden
Association football midfielders
Dutch footballers
FC Groningen players
SC Heerenveen players
SC Telstar players
Heracles Almelo players
Roda JC Kerkrade players
Eredivisie players
Eerste Divisie players
Footballers from Drenthe